Brunehaut is a municipality of Wallonia located in the province of Hainaut, Belgium. 

The municipality consists of the following districts: Bléharies (town centre), Guignies, Hollain, Howardries, Jollain-Merlin, Laplaigne, Lesdain, Rongy, and Wez-Velvain.

Twin towns
Brunehaut is twinned with Amfreville, Calvados in France.

References

External links
 

Municipalities of Hainaut (province)